The following are the telephone codes in Togo.

Calling formats

yyy xxxxx      - Calling inside Togo
+228 yyy xxxxx - Calling from outside Togo
The NSN length is eight digits.

List of area codes in Togo

References

Togo
Telephone numbers